The Venus figurines from Gönnersdorf, at Neuwied, are paleolithic sculptures depicting the female body.

Discovery
Gerhard Bosinski led the excavations between 1968 and 1976 at Neuwied a town on the Rhine in Germany.

Features
The figures consist of carved bone, antler or Mammoth tusk ivory. They are between 15,000 and 11,500 years old and stem from the Magdalenian period. These figurines are between 5.4 and 8.7 cm long. 

At the same place many engravings of animals, human beings and abstract signs on slate were found. The depictions of human beings were much stylized. Most often women were depicted, always in profile without a head. The Montastruc decorated stone (Palart 518) in the British Museum has similar stylization.

See also
Art of the Upper Paleolithic
List of Stone Age art
Venus figurines
Venus of Willendorf
Venus of Dolní Věstonice

Literature 
 Bosinski, G. (1979). Die Ausgrabungen in Gönnersdorf 1968–1976 und die Siedlungsbefunde der Grabung 1968. Mit Beiträgen von David Batchelor.  Wiesbaden: Steiner. .
 Delporte H. (1979). L’image de la femme dans l’art préhistorique. Paris: Ed. Picard.
 Müller-Beck, H. & Albrecht, G. (ed.), (1987). Die Anfänge der Kunst vor 30000 Jahren. Stuttgart: Theiss.

Notes and references

External links 
 Don Hitchcock (Don's Maps): "Gönnersdorf and Andernach-Martinsberg"
 http://www.donsmaps.com/couze.html

Archaeological discoveries in Germany
Magdalenian
Neuwied (district)
Sculptures in Germany
Gonnersdorf
Bone carvings
Ivory works of art